The Memorial Museum of Cosmonautics (Russian Музей космонавтики, also known as the Memorial Museum of Astronautics (in English) or Memorial Museum of Space Exploration) is a museum in Moscow, Russia,  dedicated to space exploration. It is located within the base of the Monument to the Conquerors of Space in the north-east of the city.
The museum contains a wide variety of Soviet and Russian space-related exhibits and models which explore the history of flight; astronomy; space exploration; space technology; and space in the arts. According to the Russian tourist board, the museum's collection holds approximately 85,000 different items and receives approximately 300,000 visitors yearly.

History 

The museum primarily focuses on the Soviet space program with major themes like the first person in space Yuri Gagarin, the rocket engineer Sergei Korolev, the satellite Sputnik and the spacecraft Soyuz.

Renovation 

On Cosmonautics Day, 2009, the museum was reopened after three years of reconstruction. It has virtually tripled its original size and has added new sections dedicated to space programs worldwide, including the USA, Europe, China and the International Space Station. The museum now features original interactive exhibits, as well as a refurbished promenade, the sculpture-lined Cosmonauts Alley which connects the museum to the Moscow metro. The museum is a favourite of students worldwide and a primary tourist attraction of the city.

Exhibits

See also
 Monument to the Conquerors of Space 
 Cosmonauts Alley

References

External links
Museum of Cosmonautics official website  
The Museum of cosmonautics from The official Russian museums list.
 Museum of Cosmonautics at Google Cultural Institute

Museums established in 1981
Museums in Moscow
Aerospace museums in Russia
History of spaceflight
Tourist attractions in Moscow
Science museums in Russia
1981 establishments in the Soviet Union
Space program of the Soviet Union